The Political Compass is a website soliciting responses to a set of 62 propositions, to rate political ideology in a spectrum with two axes: economic (left–right) and social (authoritarian–libertarian).

Overview
The website does not reveal its owners, and it seems to be based in the United Kingdom. At the bottom of its pages, the copyright is claimed as a trademark of Pace News Limited. This company is registered in New Zealand and its director is political journalist Wayne Brittenden. According to The New York Times, the site is the work of Brittenden.

According to Tom Utley for The Daily Telegraph, the site is connected to One World Action, a charity founded by Glenys Kinnock. An early version of the site was published on One World Action's web server.

Political model

The underlying theory of the political model used by The Political Compass is that political ideology may be better measured along two separate, independent axes. The economic (left–right) axis measures one's opinion of how the economy should be run. "Left" is defined as the desire for the economy to be run by a cooperative collective agency, which can mean the state but also a network of communes, while "right" is defined as the desire for the economy to be left to the devices of competing individuals and organizations.

The other axis (authoritarian–libertarian) measures one's political opinions in a social sense, regarding the amount of personal freedom that one would allow. "Libertarianism" is defined as the belief that personal freedom should be maximised, while "authoritarianism" is defined as the belief that authority should be obeyed. This makes it possible to divide people into four quadrants: authoritarian left (marked by red and placed in the top left), authoritarian right (blue in the top right), libertarian right (yellow or purple in the bottom right), and libertarian left (green in the bottom left). The makers of the Political Compass say that the quadrants "are not separate categories, but regions on a continuum".

Criticism and alternatives
The website does not explain its scoring system. Several writers have criticised its validity, including Tom Utley and Brian Patrick Mitchell.

Several other multi-axis models of political thought include some based on similar axes to The Political Compass, most famously the Nolan Chart, developed by the American libertarian, David Nolan.  A similar chart appeared in 1970 in The Floodgates of Anarchy by Albert Meltzer and Stuart Christie and in 1968 in the Rampart Journal of Individualist Thought by Maurice C. Bryson and William R. McDill.

In popular culture
PoliticalCompassMemes is a subreddit dedicated to humourous criticisism of ideologies, where users identify their ideologies with user flairs based on the Political Compass. In June 2022, the subreddit was used in a study by researchers at Monash University to predict users' political ideologies based on their digital footprints. In July 2022, the subreddit attracted media attention for announcing that it would classify baseless "grooming" claims against LGBTQ people as hate speech.

See also 
 Cleavage (politics)
 Dimensionality reduction
 F-scale (personality test)
 Left–right political spectrum
 NationStates
 Semiotic square

References

External links 

 

British political websites
Internet memes
Political Internet memes
Political spectrum

de:Politisches Spektrum#Politischer Kompass